The manga series Is It Wrong to Try to Pick Up Girls in a Dungeon? is written by Fujino Ōmori and illustrated by Kunieda. The manga is an adaptation of Fujino Ōmori's Is It Wrong to Try to Pick Up Girls in a Dungeon? light novel series published by Square Enix. The series started serialization in Square Enix's seinen manga magazine Young Gangan from August 2, 2013. It has been collected in ten tankōbon volumes. Yen Press announced at their New York Comic Con 2014 panel the rights to publish the manga in North America.

A four-panel manga series titled  by Masaya Takamura began serialization in Square Enix's online manga magazine Gangan Online from August 14, 2014.

Volume list

Is It Wrong to Try to Pick Up Girls in a Dungeon? 
A manga adaptation with art by Kunieda began serialization in Square Enix's seinen manga magazine Young Gangan from August 2, 2013. It has been collected in ten tankōbon volumes. Yen Press announced at their New York Comic Con 2014 panel the rights to publish the manga in North America.

Chapters not in tankōbon format 
Step 87. 
Step 88. 
Step 89.

Is It Wrong to Try to Pick Up Girls in a Dungeon? Season 2 
A 2nd season has started and already been collected into four volumes.

The events of the 6th book of the light novel were skipped for an unknown reason starting immediately with the 7th book instead.

Chapters not in tankōbon format

Episode Lyu
The Episode Lyu manga series is a special story focused on character Lyu Lion from the main series.

Episode Freya
The Episode Freya manga series is a special story focused on the goddess Freya and the executives of her familia.

Is It Wrong to Try to Pick Up Girls in a Dungeon? 4-koma: Days of Goddess

References

Is It Wrong to Try to Pick Up Girls in a Dungeon?